First Coast is a small settlement in Wester Ross in the North West Highlands of Scotland.

References 

Populated places in Ross and Cromarty